The Danish composer Carl Nielsen wrote his Symphony No. 3 "Sinfonia Espansiva", Op. 27, FS 60, between 1910 and 1911. Around 35 minutes in length, it is unique in his symphonic output for having vocal parts, specifically wordless solos for soprano and baritone in the second movement.

The symphony followed Nielsen's tenure as bandmaster at the Royal Danish Opera in Copenhagen. Nielsen himself conducted the premiere of the work, along with the premiere of his Violin Concerto, on February 28, 1912 with Copenhagen's Royal Danish Orchestra.

The character designation of the first movement (Allegro espansivo) serves as the symphony's subtitle, but it is not clear what Nielsen meant by 'espansiva'. Composer Robert Simpson wrote that it suggests the "outward growth of the mind's scope".

Within two months of its premiere the symphony was in the repertoire of the Royal Concertgebouw Orchestra in Amsterdam, and by 1913 it had seen performances in Germany (Stuttgart), Sweden (Stockholm) and in Finland (Helsinki).  It did not receive a public performance in the United Kingdom until 1962, under Bryan Fairfax.

Nielsen received 5,000 marks (1,100$ USD at the time) for publishing rights (C.F. Kahnt, Leipzig), a sum significantly higher than he usually received from his publishers. It was the first of Nielsen's symphonies to be commercially released on record, with Erik Tuxen conducting the Danish Radio Symphony Orchestra.

Movements

Instrumentation
 3 flutes, 3rd flute doubles piccolo
 3 oboes, 3rd oboe doubles English horn
 3 clarinets in A and B-flat
 3 bassoons, 3rd bassoon doubles contrabassoon
 4 French horns in F
 3 trumpets in F
 3 trombones (2 tenor, 1 bass)
 Tuba
 Timpani
 Soprano solo, 2nd movement only (replaceable by 4th clarinet)
 Baritone solo, 2nd movement only (replaceable by 4th trombone)
 Strings

References

Sources
Books

  See pages 105–123. Reprinted by Hyperion Press .
  See pages 112–136.
  In .

Scores

 

Symphonies by Carl Nielsen
1911 compositions